Leonardo di Bisuccio (15th century) was an Italian painter of the Renaissance period, who painted in the style of the school of Milan.

Bisuccio was born in Milan. He is best known for his frescoes of Christ Crowning  the virgin in the memorial chapel for Giovanni Carracciolo in San Giovanni a Carbonari in Naples.

Sources

15th-century Italian painters
Italian male painters
Painters from Milan
Painters from Naples
Italian Renaissance painters
Year of death unknown
Year of birth unknown